Martti Lehtevä (4 June 1931 – 21 July 2022) was a Finnish boxer. He competed in the men's light welterweight event at the 1960 Summer Olympics. At the 1960 Summer Olympics, he lost to Willie Ludick of South Africa.

References

External links
 

1931 births
2022 deaths
Finnish male boxers
Olympic boxers of Finland
Boxers at the 1960 Summer Olympics
Sportspeople from Helsinki
Light-welterweight boxers